Hernán Picó i Ribera (Barcelona, Catalonia, Spain 1911–1994) was a Spanish painter, poster designer, and visual artist.

External links
 http://hemeroteca.lavanguardia.com/preview/1951/04/22/pagina-24/32805620/pdf.html
 http://visor.artium.org/visor/imagenes_web/013000/013000/Artium013000_1.pdf

1911 births
1994 deaths
People from Barcelona
20th-century Spanish painters
20th-century Spanish male artists
Spanish male painters